DJ Marfox (born Marlon Silva in June 1988) is a Portuguese DJ.

His stage name combines the first syllable of Marlon with the name of the character featured in the Nintendo game Star Fox he used to play as a teenager.

Career
Born in Lisbon, Portugal to parents from São Tomé e Príncipe, DJ Marfox started deejaying in 2002.

In 2005, together with DJ Pausas and DJ Fofuxo he founded DJs do Guetto and a year later they released DJs do Ghetto Vol. I, a digital compilation made up of 37 tracks, onto eMule. This compilation, which has since been re-issued as a free download by Príncipe Discos, has been viewed as the foundational release of the ghetto sound of Lisbon.

His first solo album, Eu sei quem sou ("I know who I am"), released by Príncipe Discos in early 2011, was described by Philip Sherburne as “an atomic field of taut drums and hiccupping yelps and zapping synths and pinprick details."

In 2014, DJ Marfox released an EP called Lucky Punch on Lit City Trax and went on to perform in the Red Bull Music Academy in New York as well as in the Warm Up—the live music concerts curated by MoMA PS1. According to Cedar Pasori, DJ Marfox's participation in MoMA PS1's highly acclaimed experimental electronic music series, which took place on 30 August 2014, "reinforced the accelerating spread of Afro-Portuguese dance music around the world." The album Lucky Punch was listed as one of DAZED's top ten albums for August 2014. In between the aforementioned performances, the Rolling Stone magazine included him in their list of "10 New Artists You Need to Know".

One of the first international collaborations of the Portuguese DJ and producer was a rework of tUnE-yArDs' song "Water Fountain" featuring Brazilian band Pearls Negras.

On 13 March 2015 the British independent record label WARP announced the release on 7 April of a new EP called Cargaa 1 featuring DJ Marfox as the central figure of what MR P describes as the "cream-of-the-crop purveyors of Lisbon's thrilling electronic dance scene".

A compilation of songs crafted in the artist's bedroom from 2005 to 2008 was launched as a CD as well as free download under the name Revolução 2005–2008 on March 16, 2015.

Discography

Albums
Eu sei quem sou (Príncipe, 2011) – reviewed by Philip Sherburne/Resident Advisor
Artist Unknown (Pollinaire, 2012) – reviewed by Philip Sherburne/SPIN
Subliminar (Enchufada, 2013)
Lucky Punch (Lit City Trax, 2014) – reviewed by Philip Sherburne/SPIN as well as Joe Muggs & Seb Wheeler/MixMag
Revolução 2005–2008 (NOS, 2015)

Songs featured in compilations:
"Funk em Kuduro" – DJs do Guetto Vol. 1 first released in 2006; re-release in 2013 by Príncipe Discos.

Mixtapes
Distortion Ass Mix – featured in SPIN 05.07.2012
Dazed Digital (DJ Marfox Mix) – featured in DAZED DIGITAL 03.2014
The Ghetto Sound of Lisbon – featured in Resident Advisor 10.03.2014
MOMA PS1 Warm Up Mix – featured in Pitchfork 29.08.2014

References

External links
DJ Marfox on SoundCloud

Portuguese DJs
Living people
1988 births